Pentagonica flavipes is a species of ground beetle in the family Carabidae. It is found in the Caribbean Sea, Central America, North America, and the Caribbean.

Subspecies
These two subspecies belong to the species Pentagonica flavipes:
 Pentagonica flavipes flavipes (LeConte, 1853)
 Pentagonica flavipes picipes Darlington, 1936

References

Further reading

 

Harpalinae
Articles created by Qbugbot
Beetles described in 1853